The Savings Accounts and Health in Pregnancy Grant Act 2010 (c. 36) is an Act of the Parliament of the United Kingdom. It ends government support of Child Trust Funds, the Saving Gateway and the Health in Pregnancy Grant.

The Act amends the Child Trust Funds Act 2004 by closing the funds to new applicants starting in January 2011. Existing accounts would however continue to function as before. The Act also repeals the Saving Gateway Accounts Act 2009.

References

External links
Savings Accounts and Health in Pregnancy Grant Bill – official page on UK Parliament website

United Kingdom Acts of Parliament 2010